John March (born 1863 in Northern Bay) was a Canadian clergyman and prelate for the Roman Catholic Diocese of Grand Falls. He was appointed bishop in 1906. He died in 1940.

References 

1863 births
1940 deaths
Canadian Roman Catholic bishops